Andrew Allen Oliver (born December 3, 1987) is an American former professional baseball pitcher. He played in Major League Baseball (MLB) for the Detroit Tigers.

College
Oliver was drafted by the Minnesota Twins in the 17th round of the 2006 Major League Baseball Draft, but did not sign, opting instead to attend Oklahoma State University, where he played on the Oklahoma State Cowboys baseball team. In 2007, he played collegiate summer baseball with the Wareham Gatemen of the Cape Cod Baseball League.

Oliver was ruled ineligible by the NCAA in 2008, resulting from an allegation by a potential agent.  He sued the NCAA, and received a settlement of $750,000.

Professional career

Detroit Tigers
He was drafted by the Detroit Tigers in the second round of the 2009 Major League Baseball Draft. He made his major league debut on June 25, 2010. Oliver made five starts for the Tigers in 2010 before being sent back down to the Toledo Mud Hens on July 19.

On May 28, 2011, Oliver was recalled to the majors again, to fill in for the injured Phil Coke.

Pittsburgh Pirates
In December 2012, Oliver was traded to the Pittsburgh Pirates for Ramón Cabrera. He spent the 2013 season with the Triple-A Indianapolis Indians. He was outrighted to Indianapolis Indians on March 29, 2014.

Philadelphia Phillies
On December 11, 2014, Oliver was selected by the Philadelphia Phillies in Round 2 of the Rule 5 Draft selection. After being outrighted to Triple-A, he elected free agency on April 4.

Tampa Bay Rays
He signed a minor league deal with the Tampa Bay Rays on April 17, 2015. Oliver pitched for the Durham Bulls of the Class AAA International League, until he opted out of his contract in July and was granted free agency.

Baltimore Orioles
Oliver signed a minor league deal with the Baltimore Orioles on July 17, 2015. He opted out of his contract on June 3, 2016. He resigned a minor league deal with them on June 16, 2016.

Milwaukee Brewers
On December 15, 2016, Oliver signed a minor league contract with the Milwaukee Brewers that included an invitation to spring training. He was released on June 22, 2017.

See also

Rule 5 draft results

References

External links

Oklahoma State Cowboys bio

1987 births
Living people
People from Vermilion, Ohio
Baseball players from Ohio
Major League Baseball pitchers
Detroit Tigers players
Oklahoma State Cowboys baseball players
Wareham Gatemen players
Peoria Javelinas players
Erie SeaWolves players
Toledo Mud Hens players
Salt River Rafters players
Indianapolis Indians players
Tigres de Aragua players
American expatriate baseball players in Venezuela
Durham Bulls players
Norfolk Tides players
Leones del Escogido players
American expatriate baseball players in the Dominican Republic
Colorado Springs Sky Sox players